The Starfires was an American garage rock band from Los Angeles that is best known for one of the most sought-after singles of the mid-1960s, "I Never Loved Her", which can command prices of $1000 or more (although reproductions of the single are also available).  This is not the same band as the Starfires of Cleveland, the predecessor band to the Outsiders.

Discography

Singles 

 "Linda" b/w "I Never Loved Her"; G.I. Records (#4001); released May 1965
 "There's Still Time"; Yardbird Records (#4005); 1965
 "The Hardest Way:' Yardbird Records (#4006); July 1966

Compilation albums 

"I Never Loved Her"
 Pebbles, Volume 8 (LP)
 Pebbles, Volume 8 (CD)
 Essential Pebbles, Volume 1 (CD)
 Best of Pebbles, Volume 3 (LP and CD)
 Psychedelic Unknowns, Volume 1 (LP)
 Psychedelic Unknowns, Volume 2 (LP)

"Linda"
 Highs in the Mid-Sixties, Volume 1 (LP)
 Mondo Frat Dance Bash A Go Go (CD)

"Cry for Freedom"
 Pebbles, Volume 9 (CD)

"There's Still Time"
 Basementville USA! (LP)
 Acid and Flowers (CD)

"You Done Me Wrong"
 Psychedelic Unknowns, Volume 3 (LP) – second edition
 Psychedelic Unknowns, Volume 3 (CD)

"The Hardest Way"
 You're Playing with Fire (LP)
 Trip in Tyme, Volume 1 (CD)

References 
Garage Rock Radio

Musical groups from Los Angeles
Musical groups established in 1965